Carlos Alberto Ibargüen Hinojosa (born 7 October 1995) is a Colombian professional footballer who plays as a forward for Técnico Universitario. He was part of the Colombian squad at the 2015 FIFA U-20 World Cup.

External links 
 

1995 births
Living people
People from Buenaventura, Valle del Cauca
Colombian footballers
Colombia under-20 international footballers
Colombian expatriate footballers
Association football forwards
Cortuluá footballers
Tigres UANL footballers
Independiente Santa Fe footballers
Independiente Medellín footballers
FC Juárez footballers
Correcaminos UAT footballers
La Equidad footballers
Atlético Bucaramanga footballers
ŠKF Sereď players
C.D. Técnico Universitario footballers
Categoría Primera A players
Categoría Primera B players
Ascenso MX players
Slovak Super Liga players
Expatriate footballers in Mexico
Colombian expatriate sportspeople in Mexico
Expatriate footballers in Slovakia
Colombian expatriate sportspeople in Slovakia
Expatriate footballers in Ecuador
Colombian expatriate sportspeople in Ecuador
Sportspeople from Valle del Cauca Department